The 1970–71 New York Rangers season was the franchise's 45th season.

Regular season

Final standings

Schedule and results

|- align="center" bgcolor="#FFBBBB"
| 1 || 10 || @ St. Louis Blues || 3–1 || 0–1–0
|- align="center" bgcolor="#CCFFCC"
| 2 || 14 || Buffalo Sabres || 3–0 || 1–1–0
|- align="center" bgcolor="#CCFFCC"
| 3 || 17 || @ Toronto Maple Leafs || 6–2 || 2–1–0
|- align="center" bgcolor="#CCFFCC"
| 4 || 18 || Montreal Canadiens || 1–0 || 3–1–0
|- align="center" bgcolor="#CCFFCC"
| 5 || 21 || Toronto Maple Leafs || 3–2 || 4–1–0
|- align="center" bgcolor="#CCFFCC"
| 6 || 24 || @ Minnesota North Stars || 4–1 || 5–1–0
|- align="center" bgcolor="white"
| 7 || 25 || California Golden Seals || 2–2 || 5–1–1
|- align="center" bgcolor="#CCFFCC"
| 8 || 28 || Detroit Red Wings || 4–1 || 6–1–1
|- align="center" bgcolor="#FFBBBB"
| 9 || 31 || @ Boston Bruins || 6–0 || 6–2–1
|-

|- align="center" bgcolor="#CCFFCC"
| 10 || 1 || Chicago Black Hawks || 5–2 || 7–2–1
|- align="center" bgcolor="#FFBBBB"
| 11 || 4 || @ California Golden Seals || 3–1 || 7–3–1
|- align="center" bgcolor="#CCFFCC"
| 12 || 7 || @ Los Angeles Kings || 6–2 || 8–3–1
|- align="center" bgcolor="white"
| 13 || 11 || Pittsburgh Penguins || 3–3 || 8–3–2
|- align="center" bgcolor="#FFBBBB"
| 14 || 14 || @ Chicago Black Hawks || 2–1 || 8–4–2
|- align="center" bgcolor="#CCFFCC"
| 15 || 15 || Toronto Maple Leafs || 4–2 || 9–4–2
|- align="center" bgcolor="#CCFFCC"
| 16 || 18 || @ Los Angeles Kings || 5–3 || 10–4–2
|- align="center" bgcolor="#CCFFCC"
| 17 || 21 || @ Montreal Canadiens || 5–4 || 11–4–2
|- align="center" bgcolor="#CCFFCC"
| 18 || 22 || Minnesota North Stars || 2–0 || 12–4–2
|- align="center" bgcolor="#FFBBBB"
| 19 || 25 || @ Philadelphia Flyers || 3–1 || 12–5–2
|- align="center" bgcolor="white"
| 20 || 26 || @ Buffalo Sabres || 2–2 || 12–5–3
|- align="center" bgcolor="white"
| 21 || 28 || Boston Bruins || 3–3 || 12–5–4
|- align="center" bgcolor="#CCFFCC"
| 22 || 29 || Pittsburgh Penguins || 6–2 || 13–5–4
|-

|- align="center" bgcolor="#CCFFCC"
| 23 || 2 || St. Louis Blues || 4–2 || 14–5–4
|- align="center" bgcolor="#CCFFCC"
| 24 || 5 || @ Toronto Maple Leafs || 1–0 || 15–5–4
|- align="center" bgcolor="#CCFFCC"
| 25 || 6 || Vancouver Canucks || 4–1 || 16–5–4
|- align="center" bgcolor="#FFBBBB"
| 26 || 8 || @ Vancouver Canucks || 4–1 || 16–6–4
|- align="center" bgcolor="white"
| 27 || 9 || @ Los Angeles Kings || 2–2 || 16–6–5
|- align="center" bgcolor="#CCFFCC"
| 28 || 11 || @ California Golden Seals || 2–1 || 17–6–5
|- align="center" bgcolor="#CCFFCC"
| 29 || 13 || Los Angeles Kings || 4–0 || 18–6–5
|- align="center" bgcolor="#CCFFCC"
| 30 || 16 || Buffalo Sabres || 4–0 || 19–6–5
|- align="center" bgcolor="#CCFFCC"
| 31 || 19 || @ Minnesota North Stars || 5–3 || 20–6–5
|- align="center" bgcolor="#CCFFCC"
| 32 || 20 || Vancouver Canucks || 5–1 || 21–6–5
|- align="center" bgcolor="#CCFFCC"
| 33 || 22 || @ Buffalo Sabres || 7–2 || 22–6–5
|- align="center" bgcolor="#CCFFCC"
| 34 || 23 || Pittsburgh Penguins || 6–1 || 23–6–5
|- align="center" bgcolor="#FFBBBB"
| 35 || 26 || @ Detroit Red Wings || 7–4 || 23–7–5
|- align="center" bgcolor="white"
| 36 || 27 || St. Louis Blues || 4–4 || 23–7–6
|- align="center" bgcolor="#CCFFCC"
| 37 || 29 || California Golden Seals || 3–2 || 24–7–6
|-

|- align="center" bgcolor="#CCFFCC"
| 38 || 2 || @ Pittsburgh Penguins || 3–1 || 25–7–6
|- align="center" bgcolor="#CCFFCC"
| 39 || 3 || Montreal Canadiens || 6–5 || 26–7–6
|- align="center" bgcolor="#CCFFCC"
| 40 || 9 || @ Minnesota North Stars || 1–0 || 27–7–6
|- align="center" bgcolor="#CCFFCC"
| 41 || 10 || @ St. Louis Blues || 4–2 || 28–7–6
|- align="center" bgcolor="#CCFFCC"
| 42 || 12 || @ Vancouver Canucks || 4–2 || 29–7–6
|- align="center" bgcolor="#FFBBBB"
| 43 || 15 || @ California Golden Seals || 3–1 || 29–8–6
|- align="center" bgcolor="#FFBBBB"
| 44 || 17 || @ Chicago Black Hawks || 4–3 || 29–9–6
|- align="center" bgcolor="white"
| 45 || 20 || Philadelphia Flyers || 3–3 || 29–9–7
|- align="center" bgcolor="white"
| 46 || 21 || @ Buffalo Sabres || 5–5 || 29–9–8
|- align="center" bgcolor="#CCFFCC"
| 47 || 24 || Minnesota North Stars || 6–2 || 30–9–8
|- align="center" bgcolor="white"
| 48 || 27 || Boston Bruins || 2–2 || 30–9–9
|- align="center" bgcolor="#FFBBBB"
| 49 || 30 || @ Philadelphia Flyers || 5–2 || 30–10–9
|- align="center" bgcolor="white"
| 50 || 31 || Los Angeles Kings || 2–2 || 30–10–10
|-

|- align="center" bgcolor="#FFBBBB"
| 51 || 3 || Chicago Black Hawks || 4–2 || 30–11–10
|- align="center" bgcolor="#CCFFCC"
| 52 || 4 || @ Detroit Red Wings || 1–0 || 31–11–10
|- align="center" bgcolor="#CCFFCC"
| 53 || 6 || @ Vancouver Canucks || 5–4 || 32–11–10
|- align="center" bgcolor="#FFBBBB"
| 54 || 9 || @ Boston Bruins || 6–3 || 32–12–10
|- align="center" bgcolor="#CCFFCC"
| 55 || 10 || Minnesota North Stars || 4–3 || 33–12–10
|- align="center" bgcolor="#FFBBBB"
| 56 || 13 || @ St. Louis Blues || 2–1 || 33–13–10
|- align="center" bgcolor="#CCFFCC"
| 57 || 14 || St. Louis Blues || 2–1 || 34–13–10
|- align="center" bgcolor="#FFBBBB"
| 58 || 17 || @ Montreal Canadiens || 3–0 || 34–14–10
|- align="center" bgcolor="#CCFFCC"
| 59 || 20 || @ Pittsburgh Penguins || 2–0 || 35–14–10
|- align="center" bgcolor="#CCFFCC"
| 60 || 21 || Detroit Red Wings || 4–1 || 36–14–10
|- align="center" bgcolor="#CCFFCC"
| 61 || 24 || Philadelphia Flyers || 4–2 || 37–14–10
|- align="center" bgcolor="#CCFFCC"
| 62 || 27 || @ Pittsburgh Penguins || 4–0 || 38–14–10
|- align="center" bgcolor="#CCFFCC"
| 63 || 28 || Vancouver Canucks || 4–2 || 39–14–10
|-

|- align="center" bgcolor="#CCFFCC"
| 64 || 3 || California Golden Seals || 8–1 || 40–14–10
|- align="center" bgcolor="white"
| 65 || 6 || @ Detroit Red Wings || 2–2 || 40–14–11
|- align="center" bgcolor="#CCFFCC"
| 66 || 7 || Los Angeles Kings || 4–2 || 41–14–11
|- align="center" bgcolor="#CCFFCC"
| 67 || 10 || @ Chicago Black Hawks || 4–2 || 42–14–11
|- align="center" bgcolor="#CCFFCC"
| 68 || 12 || Philadelphia Flyers || 7–2 || 43–14–11
|- align="center" bgcolor="#CCFFCC"
| 69 || 14 || Toronto Maple Leafs || 1–0 || 44–14–11
|- align="center" bgcolor="#FFBBBB"
| 70 || 18 || @ Philadelphia Flyers || 2–1 || 44–15–11
|- align="center" bgcolor="#FFBBBB"
| 71 || 20 || @ Toronto Maple Leafs || 3–1 || 44–16–11
|- align="center" bgcolor="#FFBBBB"
| 72 || 21 || Montreal Canadiens || 6–2 || 44–17–11
|- align="center" bgcolor="#CCFFCC"
| 73 || 23 || Buffalo Sabres || 7–2 || 45–17–11
|- align="center" bgcolor="#CCFFCC"
| 74 || 27 || @ Boston Bruins || 6–3 || 46–17–11
|- align="center" bgcolor="#CCFFCC"
| 75 || 28 || Boston Bruins || 2–1 || 47–17–11
|- align="center" bgcolor="#CCFFCC"
| 76 || 31 || Chicago Black Hawks || 4–2 || 48–17–11
|-

|- align="center" bgcolor="#FFBBBB"
| 77 || 3 || @ Montreal Canadiens || 7–2 || 48–18–11
|- align="center" bgcolor="#CCFFCC"
| 78 || 4 || Detroit Red Wings || 6–0 || 49–18–11
|-

Playoffs

Key:  Win  Loss

Player statistics
Skaters

Goaltenders

†Denotes player spent time with another team before joining Rangers. Stats reflect time with Rangers only.
‡Traded mid-season. Stats reflect time with Rangers only.

Awards and records

Transactions

Draft picks
New York's picks at the 1970 NHL Amateur Draft in Montreal, Quebec, Canada.

Farm teams

See also
 1970–71 NHL season

References

External links
 

New York Rangers seasons
New York Rangers
New York Rangers
New York Rangers
New York Rangers
Madison Square Garden
1970s in Manhattan